The Briones Hills form a low mountain range in western Contra Costa County, in the East Bay region of the San Francisco Bay Area, California, United States.

Geography
The hills are in the Southern Inner Coast Ranges group of the California Coast Ranges System.

Cities and towns adjacent to or in the foothills of the range include: Briones, Lafayette, Martinez, Orinda, Pleasant Hill, Alhambra Valley, and Walnut Creek.

Features
Briones Regional Park, in the East Bay Regional Park District System, provides hiking trails for access. It also protects some of the range's California oak woodland, chaparral, and riparian habitats.

Briones Reservoir, of the East Bay Municipal Utility District (EBMUD), is located in the western area. It is impounded by Briones Dam on Bear Creek.

The headwaters of Pinole Creek are in the Briones Hills, on the western slope of Costa Peak. The headwaters of Alhambra Creek are in the hills within Briones Regional Park.

The privately-owned enclave along Pinole Creek is also known simply as Briones.

See also

References 

Mountain ranges of Contra Costa County, California
California Coast Ranges
Hills of California
Lafayette, California
Pleasant Hill, California
Walnut Creek, California